The Reid Avenue station was a station on the demolished BMT Lexington Avenue Line in Brooklyn, New York City. It was opened on May 13, 1885, and had 2 tracks and 2 side platforms. It was located at the intersection of Lexington Avenue and Reid Avenue, and as such it had a connection to the Utica and Reid Avenues Line streetcars.  It closed on October 13, 1950. The next southbound stop was Sumner Avenue. The next northbound stop was Gates Avenue.

References

External links

BMT Lexington Avenue Line stations
Railway stations in the United States opened in 1885
Railway stations closed in 1950
Former elevated and subway stations in Brooklyn